Rich Zecher (born October 14, 1943) is a former American football defensive tackle. He played for the Oakland Raiders in 1965, the Miami Dolphins from 1966 to 1967 and for the Buffalo Bills in 1967.

References

1943 births
Living people
American football defensive tackles
Utah State Aggies football players
Oakland Raiders players
Miami Dolphins players
Buffalo Bills players